Craig Paul Shirley (born September 24, 1956) is a conservative American political consultant and author of four books on Ronald Reagan.

Life and career

Youth and education
Shirley is the second son of Edward Bruce Shirley and Barbara Cone Shirley. His father was a founding member of the New York State Conservative Party. In 1964 he went door to door with his parents campaigning for presidential candidate Barry Goldwater. In 1978 Shirley graduated from Springfield College in Springfield, Massachusetts, where he majored in history and political science.

Career

In the 1970s, he was on the staff of Senator Jacob Javits of New York, the John N. Dalton campaign for governor of Virginia, and Senator Gordon Humphrey of New Hampshire. Ronald Reagan came into New Hampshire to campaign for Humphrey, where Shirley first met Governor Reagan.

In 1980, he ran an independent expenditure campaign in support of former California governor Ronald Reagan's presidential bid in the first six primary states on behalf of the Fund for a Conservative Majority. Shirley produced and placed radio and newspaper ads in New Hampshire, South Carolina, Florida and three other states maximizing the three quarters of a million dollars FCM budgeted for the campaign to help Reagan at a time when his campaign was short on funds.

He joined the staff of the Republican National Committee in 1982. During the 1984 presidential campaign, Shirley was the Director of Communications for the National Conservative Political Action Committee, America's largest independent political committee, which spent over $14 million on behalf of President Ronald Reagan's re-election. After the election, Shirley opened his own firm and worked on numerous matters in co-ordination with the Reagan White House including aid to the Nicaraguan Contras, support for the Strategic Defensive Initiative, support for the Afghanistan Mujahideen, support for Jonas Savimbi's UNITA, and support for the Tax Reform Act of 1986. He also worked on the White House Conference on Small Business in 1985.

In 1986, he became a consultant to the Fund for America's Future, the political action committee of Vice President George H. W. Bush and worked on George H. W. Bush's 1988 presidential bid. In 1991, Shirley ran a major advertising and public affairs campaign supporting President Bush and Operation Desert Storm, later represented the Embassy of the State of Kuwait￼ and was placed in charge of public relations for an international conference on democracy hosted in Prague by President Václav Havel of then Czechoslovakia. For a short time, Shirley and David Keene partnered in a firm, but that association ended in 1992.

During the 1990s, Shirley conceived and created Citizens for State Power, which represented small investor-owned utilities and they successfully stopped the attempts by Enron to nationalize the electricity grid. In 2000, Craig Shirley & Associates became Shirley & Banister Public Affairs. In 2019 became Shirley & McVicker Public Affairs. Shirley is the acting chairman of the political action committee, Citizens for the Republic.

Shirley is former member of the Board of Governors of the Reagan Ranch and has lectured at the Reagan Library. He was chosen in 2005 by Springfield College as their Outstanding Alumnus and has been named the Visiting Reagan Scholar at Eureka College, Ronald Reagan's alma mater. He taught a weeklong class, "Reagan 101" at Eureka College in 2012. He was also appointed as a Trustee of Eureka. He is also a member of the school's Reagan Forward Advisory Council. He has lectured at the Franklin D. Roosevelt Presidential Library, Friends of Ronald Reagan (FORR) and Robert J. Dole Institute of Politics. He has also lectured at the Buckley Center at Yale, at Larry Sabato's Center for Politics at UVA, at Georgetown University, at Hillsdale College, at Regent University, and the Miller Center of Public Affairs. He has also addressed the Ronald Reagan Lecture Series in Los Angeles in 2017.

His book December 1941: 31 Days That Changed America and Saved the World (2011), was nominated for the 2011 Book of the Year Award by Foreword Reviews magazine, a $499 pay-for-review "vanity award" service. His book, Last Act, was named best narrative in the non-fiction category by USA Book News for 2015.

Books 
 Reagan's Revolution: The Untold Story of the Campaign That Started It All (Thomas Nelson, 2005)
 Rendezvous with Destiny: Ronald Reagan and the Campaign That Changed America (Intercollegiate Studies Institute, 2009)
 December 1941: 31 Days That Changed America and Saved the World (Thomas Nelson, 2011)
 Last Act: The Final Years and Emerging Legacy of Ronald Reagan (Thomas Nelson, 2015)
 Reagan Rising: The Decisive Years, 1976-1980 (HarperCollins, 2017)
 Citizen Newt: The Making of a Reagan Conservative (Thomas Nelson, 2017)
 Mary Ball Washington: The Untold Story of George Washington's Mother (Harper Collins 2019)
 April 1945: The Hinge of History (Thomas Nelson, 2022)

Personal life
Shirley is the founder of the Ft. Hunt Youth Lacrosse Program and was a coach there for 14 years. Zorine Shirley is a Vice President of the Essex Country Historical Society.

References

External links 

 Official website
 

1956 births
Living people
American political consultants
Writers from Syracuse, New York
Springfield College (Massachusetts) alumni
Writers from New York City
People from Lancaster County, Virginia
New York (state) Republicans
Virginia Republicans
Barry Goldwater
Ronald Reagan